Molla Qasem may refer to:
 Molla Qasem, Bostanabad, East Azerbaijan Province
 Molla Qasem, Maragheh, East Azerbaijan Province
 Molla Qasem, Sistan and Baluchestan